The Capital Airport Express of the Beijing Subway, also known by the initials ABC, Airport Beijing City, is an airport rail link from Beixinqiao station to the Beijing Capital International Airport. The line became operational on July 19, 2008. On subway maps, the Capital Airport Express' color is Pantone 666C.

Overview 
Trains reverse again and proceed to Beixinqiao, stopping at Sanyuanqiao and Dongzhimen along the way.

A one-way fare on the Capital Airport Express costs RMB(¥) 25, with no free transfers from other lines.

Stations

History
The Airport Express was originally planned  to run non-stop between Dongzhimen and the Capital Airport. An intermediate stop at Sanyuanqiao was subsequently added for the convenience of passengers connecting to Line 10.

Designers for the new line considered several types of technology for the Airport Express, including:
 high-speed maglev, similar to that of the Shanghai Maglev Train
 low-speed maglev, similar to that of the Linimo line in Japan
 conventional electric motor propulsion
 linear motor propulsion

The linear motor option was ultimately decided upon.

Planning accelerated after the city won the bid to host the 2008 Summer Olympic Games, which included a promise to connect the airport to the Olympic village by subway.  The project cost ¥5.4bn and involved a consortium of companies led by the Beijing Dongzhimen Airport Express Rail Company.

The project operated under a tight delivery schedule, initially with very limited public disclosure. During construction, officials from both the Beijing Dongzhimen Airport Express Rail Co. and Bombardier expressed concerns about whether the project would be completed, as originally planned, by the end of 2007, with test operations to start in April 2008.  At the time, Zhang Jianwei, chief country representative for Bombardier, called the short timetable for a project of this type unprecedented. Zhang expressed confidence that Bombardier would meet its responsibilities as its Chinese contractors routinely worked 24 hours a day, something not possible in other countries. He also noted, however, that even if the line were to open on time, the need for haste could compromise the quality of construction.

There was also considerable uncertainty over the progress of the project, the identity of contractors and its operational arrangement. Construction was reported to have begun on June 14, 2005, but aspects of the project still awaited the central government's approval. Local media reported in January 2005 that the train supplier had been “basically decided”, but was not officially selected and announced until March 2006.

Track-laying began in March 2007 and was completed by November 2007. Testing using empty trains commenced in April 2008 and official operations started on July 19 of that year, in time for the opening of the Summer Olympic Games on August 8, 2008. The line delivered 2.17 million rides in 2008.

A  western extension to Beixinqiao station was opened for service on 31 December 2021.

Infrastructure and rolling stock
The Airport Express line adopts Advanced Rapid Transit (since renamed Innovia Metro) technology from Bombardier Transportation, with a fleet of 10 QKZ5 trains assembled by Changchun Railway Vehicles (CRV, now part of CRRC Corporation) under a technology transfer agreement. The vehicles were based on those used on AirTrain JFK in New York City, with Bombardier providing bogies as well as the electrical, propulsion and brake systems, which were assembled by CRV.

Trains are configured in fixed sets of four cars with a total of 230 seats, arranged in a longitudinal layout to maximize their quantity.

The line uses Alstom's "Urbalis" communications-based train control system, which is capable of driving trains automatically, although staff still monitor the trains from the front (Grade of Automation level 2). At the time of opening, this system made the Airport Express the first rapid transit line with automated operation in China, and the second such rail line of any kind, after the people mover in Terminal 3 at the airport, which was also supplied by Bombardier.

Since January 2020, the interiors of the QKZ5 trains were being renovated. The LCD TV display in the passenger compartment has been changed to a 27-inch smart multimedia display that can display flight information and the static paper route map above the door has also been replaced by dynamic LCD screens showing maps and passenger information.

In September 2018, an announcement requesting an 8 additional linear motor trainsets was made. CRRC Changchun won the bid in November of the same year. In 2021, the first train was delivered. The new trains have a blue livery was delivered, equipped with wider seats and mobile phone charging sockets.

Future development

Infill station

Others
In the short term, there is little scope to increase the Capital Airport Express's capacity. The 4-car train sets used on the line have significantly lower capacity than those on other Beijing Subway lines, which operate 6-car or 8-car train sets. Also, the Capital Airport Express track design requires trains from Terminal 3 to first travel to Terminal 2 before returning to the city. If trains were able to return directly from Terminal 3 to the city the capacity on the route could be increased.

Gallery

See also 
 Daxing Airport Express of Beijing Subway
 Beijing Capital Airport Bus

References

External links 

 Beijing Capital International Airport: Transport - Airport Express
 Schedule of Capital Airport Express

Beijing Subway lines
Linear motor metros
Railway lines opened in 2008
Airport rail links
2008 establishments in China
750 V DC railway electrification
Airport rail links in China